"We Didn't Have Much" is a song recorded by American country music singer Justin Moore. It was released on October 9, 2020 as the lead single from his sixth studio album Straight Outta the Country. The song was written by Randy Montana, Paul DiGiovanni and Jeremy Stover, who also produced it with Scott Borchetta.

Background
Moore said in a statement: "I think it's a poignant lyric for this time in our lives also. 2020 has led my family and I to lead a more simple life than what we are accustomed to", remarking on the beauty in that simplicity.

Content
Chris Parton of website Sounds Like Nashville referred to the song as talking his life since COVID-19 pandemic, Moore also said: "And I think this song is very very poignant if that were to apply to your life as well. Not concerned with certain things that sometimes we get wrapped up in on a day-to-day basis, and now going and borrowing eggs and flour and stuff from your neighbors and all that good stuff that we maybe had gotten away from. I know myself and my family had done that throughout this time. I think this song is very time sensitive in that regard."

Charts

Weekly charts

Year-end charts

Certifications

References

2021 singles
2021 songs
Justin Moore songs
Big Machine Records singles
Songs written by Jeremy Stover
Songs written by Randy Montana
Song recordings produced by Jeremy Stover